Austronausibius is a genus of beetles in the family Silvanidae, containing the following species:

 Austronausibius aemulus Halstead, 1980
 Austronausibius aridulus Blackburn
 Austronausibius congener Olliff
 Austronausibius edentatus Halstead
 Austronausibius leai Halstead
 Austronausibius neglectus Halstead

References

Silvanidae genera